Bruno Tshibala Nzenze (born 20 February 1956) is a Congolese politician who served as Prime Minister of the Democratic Republic of the Congo from 2017–2019.

Education
He finished primary and secondary education in Lubumbashi and studied law at the Marien Ngouabi University in Brazzaville.

Political career
He began his political career while still a student in April 1980 at the age of 24 when he joined a leftist political party in Zaire during the rule of Mobutu Sese Seko. In December 1980, he, along with 13 parliamentarians wrote a letter to ask President Mobutu for democratic reforms while the country was still under the one-party system.

On 7 April 2017, then-President Joseph Kabila appointed him as Prime Minister during a nationwide televised address. He took office on 18 May 2017.

In 2019, Tshibala made a bid to serve as a DRC Senator, but lost the Senate election on 15 March.

Arrest
The country's Attorney General accused him of organizing demonstrations on 19 and 20 September 2016 in Kinshasa. He was later granted a provisional release on 29 November 2016.

References

1955 births
Living people
Marien Ngouabi University alumni
People from Lomami Province
Prime Ministers of the Democratic Republic of the Congo
Union for Democracy and Social Progress (Democratic Republic of the Congo) politicians
Heads of government who were later imprisoned
21st-century Democratic Republic of the Congo people